Byromville is a town in Dooly County, Georgia, United States. The population was 546 at the 2010 census, up from 415 in 2000.

History
The Georgia General Assembly incorporated the Town of Byromville in 1905. The town was named in honor of early resident William H. Byrom.

Geography

Byromville is located in northwestern Dooly County at  (32.201496, -83.908028). Georgia State Route 90 passes through the center of town, leading southeast  to Vienna, the county seat, and northwest  to Montezuma. SR 230 leads northeast from Byromville  to Unadilla and southwest  to SR 27 at Drayton.

Demographics

As of the census of 2000, there were 415 people, 128 households, and 92 families residing in the town. The racial makeup of the town was 42.65% White, 51.57% African American, 0.48% Native American, 0.96% Asian, 3.61% from other races, and 0.72% from two or more races. Hispanic or Latino people of any race were 5.30% of the population.

There were 128 households, out of which 32.8% had children under the age of 18 living with them, 45.3% were married couples living together, 24.2% had a female householder with no husband present, and 28.1% were non-families. 25.0% of all households were made up of individuals, and 12.5% had someone living alone who was 65 years of age or older.  The average household size was 2.54 and the average family size was 3.02.

In the town, the population was spread out, with 19.3% under the age of 18, 7.2% from 18 to 24, 22.7% from 25 to 44, 20.0% from 45 to 64, and 30.8% who were 65 years of age or older.  The median age was 46 years. For every 100 females, there were 77.4 males.  For every 100 females age 18 and over, there were 73.6 males.

The median income for a household in the town was $21,765, and the median income for a family was $23,333. Males had a median income of $22,083 versus $19,531 for females. The per capita income for the town was $9,362.  About 25.7% of families and 27.5% of the population were below the poverty line, including 30.3% of those under age 18 and 26.7% of those age 65 or over.

Arts and culture
Byromville is host to the annual Turkey Creek Festival.

References

External links
Turkey Creek Festival

Towns in Dooly County, Georgia
Towns in Georgia (U.S. state)